Garbe may refer to
Garbe, Lahmeyer & Co., a former electrical engineering company in Aachen, Germany
Sulzberger–Garbe syndrome, a cutaneous condition
B. J. Garbe (born 1981), American baseball player
Robert Garbe (1847–1932), German railway engineer